Dustkuh (also Romanized as Dūstkūh; also known as Dūstkadeh and Dūstkū) is a village in Reza Mahalleh Rural District, in the Central District of Rudsar County, Gilan Province, Iran. At the 2006 census, its population was 269, in 83 families.

References 

Populated places in Rudsar County